Rörsjöparken is a park in Malmö, Sweden. The park was completed in 1905.

Parks in Malmö